Mephritus apicatus is a species of longhorn beetle in the Elaphidiini subfamily. It is endemic to La Chorrera, Panama where it was described by Linsley in 1935

References

Elaphidiini
Beetles described in 1935
Endemic fauna of Panama